Elachista canariella is a moth of the family Elachistidae. It is found on the Canary Islands.

References

canariella
Moths described in 1987
Moths of Africa